Terrance W. H. Tom is an American politician. He served as a Democratic member of the Hawaii House of Representatives.

Life and career
Tom is blind. He attended McKinley High School, the University of Hawaiʻi and the University of San Francisco School of Law.

In 1982, Tom was elected to the Hawaii House of Representatives, serving until 1998.

References

Living people
Year of birth missing (living people)
20th-century American politicians
Place of birth missing (living people)
Democratic Party members of the Hawaii House of Representatives
Blind politicians
University of Hawaiʻi at Mānoa alumni
University of San Francisco School of Law alumni